John Peeke (died 1716) was the speaker of the House of Assembly of Jamaica in 1688 and 1706. He owned 173 slaves according to the 1708 return.

See also
 List of speakers of the House of Assembly of Jamaica

References 

Year of birth missing
1716 deaths
Speakers of the House of Assembly of Jamaica
British slave owners